"Kill You" is a song by American rapper Eminem from his third album The Marshall Mathers LP (2000). It was released as a promotional single from the album in 2001, and was featured on the deluxe edition of his 2005 greatest hits album, Curtain Call: The Hits. The song peaked at #2 on the Bubbling Under R&B/Hip-Hop Singles chart.

Background 
"Kill You" discusses the controversy that surrounded the Eminem's first album, nightmares of "ladies' screams", and being raised by a single mother. In the song, Eminem also talks of raping his mother, and "notes the irony of magazines trumpeting his mother-raping self on their covers'." The song was written when Eminem heard the track playing in the background while talking to Dr. Dre on the phone and developed an interest in using it for a song. He then wrote the lyrics at home and met up with Dr. Dre and the two recorded the song together. The lyrics were written to show that he was still as "fucked up" as he was on The Slim Shady LP.

The song was listed as "**** You" on the back cover of the censored version of the album.

Controversies 
At a United States Senate hearing, Lynne Cheney criticized Eminem and sponsor Seagram for "promot[ing] violence of the most degrading kind against women", labeling him as "a rap singer who advocates murder and rape". She specifically cited lyrics from "Kill You", explaining, "He talks about murdering and raping his mother. He talks about choking women slowly so he can hear their screams for a long time. He talks about using O.J.'s machete on women, and this is a man who is honored by the recording industry".

On October 26, 2000, Eminem was to perform at a concert in Toronto's SkyDome. However, Ontario Attorney General Jim Flaherty argued that Canada should stop Eminem at the border. "I personally don't want anyone coming to Canada who will come here and advocate violence against women", he said. Flaherty claims to have been "disgusted" when reading transcriptions of "Kill You", which includes lines like "Slut, you think I won't choke no whore/till the vocal cords don't work in her throat no more?" Eminem's fans argued that this was a matter of free speech and that he was unfairly singled out. Eminem was later granted entry into Canada.

In 2002, French jazz pianist Jacques Loussier filed a $10 million lawsuit against Eminem and Dr. Dre, claiming the beat for "Kill You" was stolen from his song "Pulsion". He unsuccessfully demanded that all sales of the album be halted and any remaining copies destroyed.

Track listing 
Japanese CD single

Notes
 signifies a co-producer.

Charts and certifications

Charts

Certifications

Personnel 
Credits adapted from the album's liner notes and Tidal

 Eminem – vocals
 Dr. Dre – mixing and production
 Richard "Segal" Huredia – engineering
 Mike Elizondo – bass
 Mel-Man – production
 Jim McCrone – engineering assistance
 Thomas Coster Jr. – keyboards
 Sean Cruse – guitar

References 

2001 singles
Eminem songs
Songs written by Dr. Dre
Songs written by Eminem
Song recordings produced by Eminem
Aftermath Entertainment singles
Interscope Records singles
2000 songs
American hip hop songs
Hardcore hip hop songs